Rebecca Simmons is a Texas attorney and a former special justice of the Supreme Court of Texas. , Simmons continued to serve as a visiting judge on both the trial court level and appellate level, and to provide mediation and arbitration services under RebeccaSimmons PLLC.

Early life, education, and career
A fifth-generation Texan and a third-generation attorney, Simmons received a B.A. from Austin College, and a J.D. from Baylor Law School, where she served as a notes and comments editor for the Baylor Law Review. Following law school Simmons served as a briefing attorney for the Texas Supreme Court. A recipient of an International Rotary Fellowship, Simmons continued her legal studies at Durham University in England, focusing on the emerging European Economic Community, prior to settling in San Antonio. Simmons practiced law at Akin Gump Strauss Hauer & Feld LLP in San Antonio, where she specialized in complex commercial litigation.

Judicial service and activity in the legal community
After twenty years in private practice, Rebecca Simmons was appointed as district judge of the 408th Judicial District Court in Bexar County and was subsequently elected. Based on her proven track record on the district bench, she was selected to serve on the Fourth Court in May 2005 and then elected in 2006. She served as an adjunct professor at St. Mary's School of Law for over 15 years. In 2005, Simmons was specially commissioned as a Supreme Court justice to sit on a pending case before the Texas Supreme Court. In 2012 Simmons lost her re-election campaign. , she was seeking election to the Fourth Court of Appeals place 5 currently held by Justice Angelini, who has announced her retirement at the end of her term.

Simmons is an active member of the legal community. , she was chair of the Judicial Committee on Information Technology which advises the Texas Supreme Court on technology issues. She has also been District Representative of the State Bar of Texas, and a Litigation Section Council Member. She is a former chair of the Texas Bar Foundation, which provides over $500,000 a year in grants for legal services and education. A recipient of the State Bar of Texas Presidential Citation, she is a member of the Pattern Jury Charge Committee. She is a former president of the San Antonio Bar Association, the William S. Sessions American Inns of Court, and the Bexar County Women’s Bar Association. She is an active lecturer and speaker on a variety of legal topics.

Personal life
Simmons is married to Dr. Richard Clemons and they have three children: Rachael, Sarah and Patrick. She has two brothers who are attorneys and one brother who is a district judge.

References

News Articles 
 Seventh Woman Picked for Bench", San Antonio Express-News, April 1, 2005
 "Gov. Perry Appoints Simmons to 408th District Court", Governor's Press Office, Apr. 07, 2003

External links 
 Fourth Court of Appeals Web Site
 Justice Rebecca Simmons for Texas Supreme Court
 Texas Bar Foundation Web Site
 "Community Justice Program celebrates 4th anniversary", San Antonio Bar Association Web site (photo)

Year of birth missing (living people)
Living people
Baylor Law School alumni
Texas state court judges
American women judges
Women in Texas politics
Alumni of Durham University
21st-century American women